Tewodros Shiferaw (born 21 September 1980) is an Ethiopian runner specialising in the 3000 metres steeplechase. Later in his career he focused more on road-running.

Tewodros competed at one Olympic Games and two World Championships each time failing to advance to the final. His steeplechase personal best is 8:22.22 from 2004.

Competition record

External links
 
 
 

1980 births
Living people
Ethiopian male steeplechase runners
Athletes (track and field) at the 2004 Summer Olympics
Olympic athletes of Ethiopia
African Games bronze medalists for Ethiopia
African Games medalists in athletics (track and field)
Athletes (track and field) at the 2003 All-Africa Games
20th-century Ethiopian people
21st-century Ethiopian people